The 2015 Foster Farms Bowl was an American college football bowl game that was played on December 26, 2015 at Levi's Stadium in Santa Clara, California. It was one of the 2015–16 bowl games that concluded the 2015 FBS football season. The 14th edition of the Foster Farms Bowl (previously known as the Fight Hunger Bowl) featured the UCLA Bruins from the Pac-12 Conference against the Nebraska Cornhuskers from the Big Ten Conference. Since there were not enough bowl-eligible teams at the end of the regular season, 5–7 Nebraska was given a spot in this bowl because of its high Academic Progress Rate. Underdog Nebraska was victorious, winning the game 37–29.

Teams
The game represented the 13th overall meeting between these two teams, but was the first of those meetings to occur in a bowl game.  After this game, Nebraska leads the all-time series 7–6.

Nebraska

UCLA

The Bruins were led by freshman quarterback Josh Rosen, who had completed 266 passes for an average of 279.2 yards per game. The team led the Pac-12 conference in sacks against (1.17 per game), pass defense efficiency (111.5), and pass defense (205.7 yards per game).

Game summary

Scoring summary

Statistics

Depth chart

Depth chart

Game notes
 Coach Riley is the first head coach to win this game twice. The first time was with Oregon State in 2007.

References

External links
 Game summary at ESPN

Foster Farms Bowl
Redbox Bowl
Nebraska Cornhuskers football bowl games
UCLA Bruins football bowl games
San Francisco Bowl
December 2015 sports events in the United States